Conochilidae is a family of rotifers in the order Flosculariaceae, found in marine environments.  It only has one genus, Conochilus, itself only consisting of two species.

References

Monogeneric protostome families
Flosculariaceae
Rotifer families